Mont Gond is a mountain of the Bernese Alps, overlooking Derborence in Valais. It is located between the Diablerets and the Rhone valley.

References

External links
Mont Gond on Hikr

Mountains of the Alps
Mountains of Switzerland
Mountains of Valais
Two-thousanders of Switzerland